Fly Like an Eagle is the ninth studio album by American rock band Steve Miller Band, released in May 1976 by Capitol Records in the United States, Canada and Japan and Mercury Records in Europe.

The album was a success, spawning three singles: the title track, "Take the Money and Run" and "Rock'n Me", and eventually receiving quadruple platinum certification from the RIAA.

Fly Like an Eagle was voted number 400 in the third edition of Colin Larkin's All Time Top 1000 Albums (2000). In 2012, the album was ranked number 445 on Rolling Stone magazine's list of "The 500 Greatest Albums of All Time."

The album remains a staple of rock and its singles remain in constant rotation on classic rock radio stations in the United States and worldwide.

Critical reception 

Stephen Thomas Erlewine in a retrospective review for AllMusic felt that "the focus brings about his strongest set of songs (both originals and covers), plus a detailed atmospheric production where everything fits." However, he said that "it still can sound fairly dated", but concluded the review by saying that "its best moments [...] are classics of the idiom." Rolling Stone voted it 1976's Best Album. Jay Cridlin of the Tampa Bay Times described "Dance, Dance, Dance" as "the best John Denver song John Denver never recorded".

Track listing 

* Contains a brief sample from Cheech & Chong's comedy routine "Championship Wrestling" (from Cheech & Chong's Wedding Album, 1974), inserted after the first verse. The sample includes the words "...c'mon, don't be nervous!"

Personnel

Steve Miller Band 
 Steve Miller – lead vocals, guitar, keyboards, sitar, ARP Odyssey (on tracks 1, 2, 10, 12), producer
 Lonnie Turner – bass (on all tracks but 12)
 Gary Mallaber – drums (on all tracks but 12)

Additional personnel 
 James Cotton – harmonica (on track 11)
 Curley Cooke – guitar (on track 12)
 Les Dudek – guitar (on track 12)
 Charles Calamise – bass (on track 12)
 Kenny Johnson – drums (on track 12)
 John McFee – dobro (on track 5)
 Joachim Young – B3 organ (on tracks 2 and 12)

Technical 
 John Palladino – executive producer
 Mike Fusaro – recording engineer
 Jim Gains – mastering
 Susan McCardle – photography
 David Stahl – photography

Quadraphonic and original editions 
A Quadraphonic mix of the album was available on the Quadraphonic 8-Track cartridge format (in which Track 1 - "Space Intro" is edited into "Fly Like an Eagle" as one track, and Track 6 - "Take the Money and Run" intro repeats twice).

On the U.K. original vinyl release "Space Intro" does not appear on track listing. A 40-second track called "Space Odyssey" segues into "Wild Mountain Honey".

30th anniversary edition 

In 2006 the album was re-released to celebrate its 30th anniversary. The CD is digitally remastered and includes three bonus tracks and a bonus DVD features a concert performance at Mountain View, California's Shoreline Amphitheatre in 2005 with over two hours of music in 5.1 Surround Sound (Note this surround mix is not based on the QUAD mix as track 1 and 6 are not different from the standard releases). Guest musicians include George Thorogood and Joe Satriani. The DVD also features a lengthy interview with Steve Miller, archive footage, never-before-seen photographs, and early demo recordings.

Live at Shoreline Amphitheatre

September 17, 2005
Swingtown
True Fine Love
Abracadabra
Dance Dance Dance
Wild Mountain Honey
Nature Boy
Mercury Blues
The Stake
Shu Ba Da Du Ma Ma Ma Ma
I Love the Life I Live, I Live the Life I Love (featuring George Thorogood)
Got Love If You Want It (featuring George Thorogood)
Gangster of Love (featuring George Thorogood)
All Your Love (I Miss Loving) (featuring Joe Satriani)
I'm Tore Down (featuring Joe Satriani)
Slow Blues (featuring Joe Satriani)
Crossroads (featuring Joe Satriani)
Fly Like an Eagle (featuring Joe Satriani)
Take the Money and Run
Rock'n Me
Jungle Love
The Joker
Encore: Serenade (featuring Joe Satriani)

Charts

Certifications

References 

1976 albums
Steve Miller Band albums
Capitol Records albums
Mercury Records albums